Abadchi-ye Olya (also Romanized as Ābādchī-ye ‘Olyā; also known as Ābādchī and Ābādchī-ye Bālā) is a village in Kabutarsorkh Rural District, in the Central District of Chadegan County, Isfahan Province, Iran. At the 2006 census, its population was 279, in 77 families.

References 

Populated places in Chadegan County